Eldon Bramble (1931 – 12 May 1977) was a Vincentian cricketer. He played in one first-class match for the Windward Islands in 1959/60.

See also
 List of Windward Islands first-class cricketers

References

External links
 

1931 births
1977 deaths
Saint Vincent and the Grenadines cricketers
Windward Islands cricketers